Walnut is an unincorporated community in Pickaway County, in the U.S. state of Ohio.

History
The first store at Walnut opened in 1834. A post office called Walnut was established in 1890, and remained in operation until 1902.

References

Unincorporated communities in Pickaway County, Ohio
Unincorporated communities in Ohio